Beit Hashmonai is a community settlement in central Israel. Located five kilometers south-east of Ramla, it falls under the jurisdiction of Gezer Regional Council. In , it had a population of ..

History
Beit Hashmonai was established in 1970 by the Jewish Agency for teachers at the nearby Ayalon School on land that had belonged to the depopulated Palestinian village of al-Barriyya. It is named for Simon Maccabaeus, a member of the Hasmonean family who captured the ancient city of Gezer, located nearby.

In 1987 it was designated a community centre for the regional council, with the council's offices moved to the village.

References

External links
Official website

Populated places established in 1970
Populated places in Central District (Israel)
1970 establishments in Israel
Community settlements